Dame Beryl Carnegy Oliver, Lady Oliver,  (née Joseph; 20 August 1882 – 13 July 1972) was a British charity administrator as well as the British Red Cross Society's Director of Education.

Early life
Oliver was born in Australia to British parents, Francis Edward Joseph and Isabella Eliza Butter ( Carnegy) Joseph. She had a younger brother, Ughtred Elliot Joseph (later Ughtred Elliot Carnegy, of Lour).

Isabella came from a titled Scottish family; her father, Patrick Carnegy of Lour, was a descendant of David Carnegie, 2nd Earl of Northesk. The family later adopted the Carnegy surname after Isabella succeeded to her father's estates in 1915. Oliver was educated privately in England and France. On 10 June 1914, she married Rear-Admiral (later Admiral of the Fleet) Sir Henry Oliver of the Royal Navy.

Career
In 1910, she joined the St John Ambulance Brigade and rapidly rose through the ranks. On the outbreak of the First World War she was put in charge of the Naval and Military Volunteer Aid Detachment (VAD) Department, which administered the combined nursing staff of St John Ambulance and the British Red Cross Society. She held the post throughout the war, but resigned in 1922 in opposition to plans to disband the VADs. She later joined the British Red Cross Society as head of its VAD department. 

She was credited with keeping the British Red Cross alive after the First World War, as she was later eulogised by a friend in The Times.  During the Second World War she was a member of the Society's War Organisation Executive Committee and several other committees. After the war she became the Society's Director of Education, retiring in 1956. She then became the BRCS's archivist and published its definitive history, The British Red Cross in Action, in 1966. She published a second book, The Church of Saint Mary the Virgin, Aldermanbury, in 1969.

Honours
In recognition of her work in the First World War, Oliver was awarded the Royal Red Cross (RRC) in 1916, and appointed Commander of the Order of the British Empire (CBE) in the 1919 New Year Honours and Dame Commander of the Order of the British Empire (DBE) in the 1920 civilian war honours.

In recognition of her work in the Second World War, she was appointed Dame Grand Cross of the Order of the British Empire (GBE) in the 1948 New Year Honours. After the King invested her as a Dame Grand Cross, the Queen, as President of the British Red Cross Society, presented her with a diamond brooch at a party at Buckingham Palace.

Death
Her husband died in 1965, aged 100. She died in London in 1972, aged 89. Per her wishes, her ashes were interred on the Hill of Lour, Angus.

References

1882 births
1972 deaths
British humanitarians
Dames Grand Cross of the Order of the British Empire
Members of the Royal Red Cross
English archivists
British women in World War I
British women in World War II
Australian people of Scottish descent
Australian emigrants to England
Wives of knights